English Island may refer to:

 English Island, Isles of Scilly, an uninhabited rocklet in the Isles of Scilly in England
 English Island (South Australia), an island in the Sir Joseph Banks Group in Spencer Gulf in Australia